Sheikh Basheer Ahmed Muhuyiddin, Arabic: الشيخ بشير احمد محي الدين) is an Islamic scholar, preacher, and author. He was born in 1937 at his hometown of Paravanna in Malapuram district. He was the third son of the famous scholar and Muslim personality, Paravanna Muhyaddeen Musliyar. He pursued his primary education from Darul Uloom Vazhakkad and at Baqiyath Swalihath,vellur. He pursued his higher education by studying abroad and finished his post graduation at Al-Azhar University, Cairo and then at Elorin University, Nigeria. While working at Darul Ifta of Saudi Arabia, he was appointed as first official of its propagation center to African countries in Nigeria.  A significant portion of his life and work was spent translating the Qur'an into three Nigerian languages, Hausa, Yoruba and Ibo, and the English translation “Quran: the Living Truth".  Apart from these major contributions, Sheikh Basheer has written numerous Islamic books, notable among which is the Islamic Religious Knowledge series including Quran, Hadeeth, Fiqh and Islamic History. He died on 25 June 2005.

Early life
Sheikh Basheer Ahmad Muhyaddeen was born in 1937 in his native place Paravanna near Thirur in
Malapuram. He was the third son of Aisha Umma and Paravanna Mohyuddeen Musliyar, an Islamic scholar and orator of his time, and more importantly, he was also the founder of the Samastha Kerala Islamic Matha VidyaByasa Board (SKIMVB), and remained an active member of the organization until his death in the late 1950s. The SKIMVB was instrumental in paving the way for compulsory Islamic education with a very broad syllabus that is still adhered to by numerous religious institutes in Kerala, India.

Family and early life
Sheikh Basheer followed the footsteps of his illustrious father, and like him was a very talented orator. His oratory and writing skills were widely appreciated by the masses, and he made the president of the Sunni Yuvajana Sangam (a youth wing of the SKIMVB) .

His wife Asiya, was the daughter of Abdul Rahman Musliyar, an eminent scholar from Panayikulam, Kerala.

In scholar’s centre
After completing his study in Paravanna and Vazhakkad he moved to Tanur, where he was under the tutelage of his father, at the Tanur Islahul Uloom . While here, a fortunate meeting with Hazrath Adam, from the famous Baaqiyaath Assalihaath, enabled him to enrol himself at the prestigious institute., from where he successfully graduated.

In the capital of culture
Having acquired religious knowledge from well known scholars from his country, Sheikh Basheer now set his sights on the world famous Al Azhar University in Egypt. With this goal,  he set sail for Cairo, after performing his Hajj . Even after arriving at Cairo, following an arduous journey, his admission to Al Azhar remained uncertain.

A mission in Saudi Arabia
Upon successfully completing his Master's degree from Al Azhar, Sheikh Basheer was employed by Darul Iftaah in Saudi Arabia in Saudi1965 and appointed as heir missionary representative in West Africa, especially Nigeria.

Friends with great persons
Shihab Thangal and Sheikh Basheer Ahmed Muhyudden were best friends, when he was studying in Al Azhar University, Cairo. Shihab Thangal says that by his demise the world lost an excellent scholar and brilliant propagator. Their friendship was tightened thoroughly.Sayyid Abdurahman Imbichikoya Thangal Al-Aydarusi Al-Azhari was senior student at Al Azhar University and Karalite amongst Al-Azhar students. Azhar Thangal says about Basheer: “there is no room for ambiguity that Basheer Ahmad was one of the Islamic scholar who dedicated their life for the maintenance of Islam and Muslims”.

References 

1937 births
Al-Azhar University alumni
Indian Muslims
20th-century Muslim scholars of Islam
2005 deaths